L-ornithine N5 monooxygenase (EC 1.14.13.195 or EC 1.14.13.196) is an enzyme which catalyzes one of the following chemical reactions:L-ornithine + NADPH + O2  N(5)-hydroxy-L-ornithine + NADP+ + H2O

L-ornithine + NAD(P)H + O2  N(5)-hydroxy-L-ornithine + NAD(P)+ + H2O The three ligands of this enzyme are L-ornithine (substrate), FAD (cofactor), and NADPH or NAD(P)H (cofactor and electron donor).

Enzyme classification 
L-ornithine N5 monooxygenase is classified under two EC numbers - EC1.14.13.195  and EC 1.14.13.196. The first number, 1, identifies the enzyme as an oxidoreductase. The subsequent 14 refers to the fact that this enzyme acts "on paired donors, with incorporation or reduction of molecular oxygen". The 13 identifies this enzyme as using NADH or NAD(P)H as one donor, while incorporating one atom of oxygen onto the other. This is why there are two EC numbers for this enzyme - one ends with 195 referring to NADPH as the donor, while the 196 refers to NAD(P)H as the donor.

Structure 
L-ornithine N5 monooxygenase adopbts an oxidoreductase Rossmann fold tertiary structure that binds FAD and NADP cofactors.

Crystallographic structures have been solved for this class of enzymes from Aspergillus fumigatus. These structures reflect structural changes which take place when the enzyme binds combinations of ligands, including ornithine and NADP. Additional structures have also been solved for strain Af293. These structures reflect different redox and ligation states. The following table briefly describes these crystal structures:

In A. fumigatus, the enzyme is named Af SidA for siderophore biosynthesis protein A. It has three domains for ornithine (substrate), FAD (cofactor), and NAD(P)H (cofactor and electron donor). The enzyme is a homotetramer.

N-hydroxylating flavin-containing monooxygenase (NMO) enzymes such as this target the nucleophilic terminal amine groups of primary aliphatic amines such as L-ornithine. The enzyme operates via a multistep oxidative mechanism which has a C4a-hydroperoxyflavin intermediate. SidA stabilizes this intermediate and keeps NADP+ bound throughout the remainder of the catalytic cycle because it is necessary for intermediate stabilization. The nicotinamide-ribose moiety and H-bonding between the main chain and residues Lys107, Asn293, and Ser469 position the L-ornithine alpha carbon such that its side chain amino group can be hydroxylated by the C4a-(hydro)peroxyflavin. Unlike many other NMOs, A. fumigatus SidA strictly acts on ornithine. Interactions with arginine increase interactivity between the reduced flavin and oxygen.

The active site is located within a cleft at the interface between the three domains on each subunit. SidA has a resting state (6X0H) in which neither L-ornithine nor NAD(P)H is bound. This resting state has an "out" active site caused by large rotations of the FAD isoalloxazine and a 10-Å movement of the Tyrosine loop. Either flavin reduction or NAD(P)H binding drives the active site to the "in" conformation (6X0I).

SidA demonstrates typical kinetics when saturated with L-ornithine. Inhibition is caused by high concentrations of NADPH and NADH. There is an 8-fold increase in catalytic efficiency for NADPH compared to NADH. NADP+ is a competitive inhibitor with respect to NADPH.

Function 
This enzyme is widely distributed, especially among eukaryotes, being found in Fungi, Metazoa, Protista, Viridiplantae, Choanoflagellates, and Icththyosporeans. Among Bacteria, it is found in Kutzneria sp. 744, and an ornithine hydroxylase from Pseudomonas aeruginosa has a similar structure and 41% amino acid similarity to that of A. nidulans.

In addition to being found in the non-pathogenic fungi such as Aspergillus nidulans, it is also found in many fungal pathogens such as Aspergillus fumigatus, Botrytis cinerea, Fusarium oxysporum, Magnaporthe oryzae, Sclerotinia sclerotiorum, Spizellomyces punctatus, and Ustilago maydis.

In A. fumigatus, it is classified as a flavoprotein because FAD is a cofactor. It catalyzes the FAD and NADPH-dependent hydroxylation of L-ornithine in biosynthesis of the ferrichrome siderophores triacetylfusarinine and desferriferricrocin. It is produced primarily under iron-limited conditions. Siderophores are also important for virulence.

In Kutzneria sp. 744, this enzyme is involved in the biosynthesis of piperazate, which contributes to the biosynthesis of kutzneride antifungal antibiotics.

References 

EC 1.14.13
Enzymes of known structure